Adriaan Jakobus "Ad" Kaland (13 March 1922 – 11 January 1995) was a Dutch politician of the Christian Democratic Appeal (CDA). He served as a Member of the Senate from 20 September 1977, until 1 January 1994. Between 1953 and 1962 he was member of the municipal council of Middelburg, serving as an alderman as well in his final four years. Between 1958 until 1978 he was member of the States-Provincial (provincial council) of Zeeland, serving as member of the Gedeputeerde staten (provincial executive) concurrently between 1962 and 1978.

References

External links
  A.J. (Ad) Kaland (Parlement & Politiek)
  A.J. Kaland (CDA) (Eerste Kamer der Staten-Generaal)

1922 births
1995 deaths
Members of the Senate (Netherlands)
Members of the Provincial Council of Zeeland
Members of the Provincial-Executive of Zeeland
Municipal councillors in Zeeland
People from Middelburg, Zeeland
Christian Historical Union politicians
20th-century Dutch politicians
Christian Democratic Appeal politicians
Dutch civil servants
Dutch corporate directors
Dutch police officers
Dutch farmers
Dutch members of the Dutch Reformed Church
Knights of the Order of the Netherlands Lion
Commanders of the Order of Orange-Nassau
People from Veere